Sotirios Bretas (born 12 March 1990) is a Greek male  track cyclist. He competed in the sprint, team sprint and scratch events at the 2013 UCI Track Cycling World Championships.

References

External links
 
 

1990 births
Living people
Greek track cyclists
Greek male cyclists
Place of birth missing (living people)
Sportspeople from Volos
21st-century Greek people